Bowon Niwet is a khwaeng (subdistrict) of Phra Nakhon District, in Bangkok, Thailand. In 2017 it had a total population of 4,837 people.

References

Subdistricts of Bangkok
Phra Nakhon district